Pelopsia is a vision perception disorder in which objects appear nearer than they actually are. Pelopsia can be caused by psychoneurotic phenomena, changes in atmospheric clarity, or sometimes by wearing a corrective lens.

See also
Teleopsia
Vision deficiencies and disorders

References

Eye diseases
Visual disturbances and blindness